Aframomum singulariflorum is a species in the ginger family, Zingiberaceae.  It was first described by Dhetchuvi.

Range
The species' range is the Democratic Republic of the Congo.

References 

singulariflorum